Akhaa Ahli Aley Football Club, commonly referred to as Akhaa Ahli Aley, Akhaa Ahli or simply Akhaa, is a football club based in Aley, Lebanon, that competes in the .

Akhaa have played in the Lebanese Premier League since 2010–11 season, after gaining promotion from the Lebanese Second Division. They won the Lebanese Challenge Cup in 2022. The club is supported by the Lebanese MP Arkram Chehayeb, who was the key person to ratify the merging of the two clubs Ahli and Akhaa in the city of Aley.

History

Origins: Akhaa and Ahli
Akhaa was first founded in 1962 by Adel Baz, who led the club till the early 1980s amid the Lebanese Civil War. The club obtained its license in 1966 and was close to promotion in 1971, failing to reach the Lebanese Premier League in the last match. The club halted its activities in 1982 during the Lebanese war and resumed in 1989.

Ahli Club was established in the 1970s by Ahmad Radwan, an educator and the owner of a school in Aley. Ahli Club obtained its license later and joined the Lebanese Third Division in 1987. Various players who would go on to play in the Lebanese Premier League played for Ahli Club, such as Walid Zeineddine, Fouad Sayegh, Riad Al Halabi, Yazeed Halimi and others. Ahli Club was ranked first in the American University of Beirut Football Cup twice in a row, in 1987 and 1988.

Formation of Akhaa Ahli
In 1990, Bahij Abou Hamzeh, the president of Akhaa, realized that promotion to the Lebanese Premier League would be difficult, so he decided to merge with Ahli Club. The merger added extra value to Akhaa Club as Ahli's team was full of young players of Aley, such as Zaher Andary, who represented the Lebanon national football from 1994 to 2001, Said Abu Muna and Raji Abi Said, who was elected captain of Ahkaa Ahli. Ahli's management found the merger to be of mutual interest as they needed physical and logistical support to get promoted to the Lebanese Second Division.

Promotion and stay in the Premier League
Akhaa won the Lebanese Second Division in 1992–93. The team managed to hit excellent results during its stay in the Lebanese Premier League, especially in its first appearance. It returned to the first division in 2010, staying there ever since.

On 21 August 2022, after defeating rivals Safa 1–0 in the final, Akhaa were crowned 2022 Lebanese Challenge Cup champions.

Club rivalries 
Akhaa plays the Mountain derby with Safa.

Players

Current squad

Notable players

Retired numbers 

In 2020, Akhaa Ahli Aley retired the squad number 20 for two seasons, in memory of Mohamed Atwi who died on 18 September 2020 from a stray bullet to the head.
 20  Mohamed Atwi, midfielder (2018–2020) – posthumous honour (2020–2022)

Honours
Lebanese Challenge Cup
Winners (1): 2022

Lebanese Second Division
Winners (2): 1992–93, 2002–03

See also 
 List of football clubs in Lebanon

References

External links

 Akhaa Ahli Aley FC at LebanonFG

 
Football clubs in Lebanon
1962 establishments in Lebanon